Alfred Allen Lary (September 26, 1928 – July 9, 2001) was an American professional baseball player. He was a right-handed pitcher who appeared in 29 games — 16 as a pitcher, 12 as a pinch runner and one as a pinch hitter — for the Chicago Cubs of Major League Baseball from 1954-55 and again in 1962. Prior to playing pro baseball, Lary had an outstanding college football career at the University of Alabama. He was the older brother of Detroit Tigers' All-Star pitcher Frank Lary.

He signed his first contract with the Cubs before the 1951 season, spent 1953 in military service, and made his Major League debut on September 25, 1954, starting against the Cincinnati Redlegs at Wrigley Field. The opposing pitcher was Art Fowler. Lary pitched six innings and allowed two earned runs, receiving no decision in the 4–2 Cubs victory. He was with the Cubs briefly in 1955 and was used in four games, all as a pinch runner. It would be seven years before he reached the Major League level again.

Lary gave up Willie Mays' 324th career home run, a grand slam, in Candlestick Park on April 28, 1962. His career totals for his 16 career games pitched include a win–loss record of 0–1, four games started, four games finished, and an ERA of 6.52.  In 40 innings pitched he struck out 22, walked 22, and allowed 45 hits. He spent his entire, 13-year baseball career as a member of the Cubs' organization.

Lary died by accidental drowning in his hometown of Northport, Alabama, at the age of 72. Lary had Parkinson's disease at the time of his death.

See also
 Alabama Crimson Tide football yearly statistical leaders

References

External links

Retrosheet
Al Lary - Baseball Biography

1928 births
2001 deaths
Accidental deaths in Alabama
Alabama Crimson Tide football players
Baseball players from Alabama
Chicago Cubs players
Deaths by drowning in the United States
Des Moines Bruins players
Fort Worth Cats players
Houston Buffs players
Los Angeles Angels (minor league) players
Macon Peaches players
Major League Baseball pitchers
Memphis Chickasaws players
Nashville Vols players
People from Northport, Alabama
People with Parkinson's disease
Portland Beavers players
Salt Lake City Bees players
Springfield Cubs (Massachusetts) players
Tulsa Oilers (baseball) players
Alabama Crimson Tide baseball players